Fernando Kalife (Monterrey, Mexico) is a Mexican film director, screenwriter and producer.

Biography 
Born in Monterrey Mexico. 

USC Film School 

Writer/Director

Feature films 

 7 Days (Best Film, Best Director in the country by specialized press, 5 Mexican Academy Nominations)

 180º (Santa Barbara International Film Festival, winner of Best Film Nevada Film Festival, California Filmfest, Kofi Annan says: “A film of change that should be seen by everyone in our planet.”

 108 Stitches (Kuno Becker’s best performance yet)

 A Silicon Valley Story (pre production)

Documentaries 
 From Director to Director 
 Arriving Home
 R75
 Becoming Champions (Series Netflix Exclusive)
 Mexico Champion of the World (in post-production)

Awards and nominations 
 Worldfest Film Festival Winner of the Bronze Award, Best Comedy Original… for The Mexican Way (2000)
 Mexican Cinema Journalists Silver Goddess Best Direction… for 7 Días (2005)
 San Antonio International Film Festival Best Film… for 7 Días (2005)
 5 Mexican Academy nominations (Ópera Prima, Best Edition, Best Music Composition, Best Photography, Best Actor) for 7 Días (2006)
 Costa Rica International Film Festival Best Film… for 180º (2011)
 Santa Barbara International Film Festival Nominated Best Spanish Language Film… for 180º (2011)
 Tiburon International Film Fest Golden Reel Award… for 180º (2012)
 Nevada Film Festival Silver Award Best Feature… for 180º (2012)
 California Film Festival Best Narrative Feature… for 180º (2012)

References

External links 
 Official Website
 

1964 births
Living people
Mexican film directors
Mexican screenwriters
Spanish-language film directors